Hussein Ziad Odtallah (born January 1, 1985) is a Jordanian footballer, of Palestinian origin, who is a left winger for That Ras.

References

External links 
 
 
 

1985 births
Living people
Jordanian footballers
Jordan international footballers
Association football forwards
That Ras Club players
Shabab Al-Ordon Club players
Sahab SC players
Mansheyat Bani Hasan players
Al-Faisaly SC players